The red-chested cuckoo (Cuculus solitarius) is a species of cuckoo in the family Cuculidae. It is a medium-sized bird found in Africa south of the Sahara. In Afrikaans, it is known as "Piet-my-vrou", after its call.

Description
The male has slate-grey upper parts, pale grey throat and sides of head and dark grey tail tipped with white. The breast is rufous or cinnamon, often with barring, and the belly is creamy-white or pale buff. The female is similar but the colour of the breast is duller and with variable amounts of barring.

Distribution and habitat

It is found in Angola, Benin, Botswana, Burundi, Cameroon, Central African Republic, Chad, Republic of the Congo, Democratic Republic of the Congo, Ivory Coast, Equatorial Guinea, Eswatini, Ethiopia, Gabon, Gambia, Ghana, Guinea, Guinea-Bissau, Kenya, Lesotho, Liberia, Malawi, Mali, Mozambique, Namibia, Nigeria, Rwanda, Senegal, Sierra Leone, Somalia, South Africa, Sudan, Tanzania, Togo, Uganda, Zambia, and Zimbabwe. In Southern Africa it is a common breeding migrant, found throughout the area except for the drier west. The preferred habitats for the red-chested cuckoo are woodlands. The red-chested cuckoo is normally seen by itself rather than in the company of birds of the same species.

Behaviour
It is usually solitary and highly vocal and lives on forests and plantations. It eats insects including hairy caterpillars, spiders, centipedes, millipedes, slugs, snails, small vertebrates and berries.

The red-chested cuckoo takes on more than a single mate (it is polygamous). The nesting habit of red-chested cuckoo is to use the nest of another bird (brood parasitism). About fifteen different species of small bird are parasitised but the most common hosts are the Cape robin-chat (Cossypha caffra), the Cape wagtail (Motacilla capensis) and the white-throated robin-chat (Cossypha humeralis).
The surrogate family then raise the chick. The bird lays eggs which are brown in colour and number between 20 eggs per season in different nests. Like other cuckoos, the red-chested cuckoo lays its eggs in other birds’ nests, leaving the parasitized birds to care for the cuckoo chicks, which they do, believing it is their own offspring.

References

External links
 Red-chested cuckoo - Species text in The Atlas of Southern African Birds.

red-chested cuckoo
Birds of the Gulf of Guinea
Birds of Sub-Saharan Africa
red-chested cuckoo
Taxonomy articles created by Polbot